Alida van Rensselaer Livingston ( Schuyler; 1656–1727) was a Dutch businessperson in Dutch colony in America who exerted a considerable influence in the life of the colony.

Early life
She was born in Beverwyck (Albany), in the New Netherlands (New York) as the daughter of the wealthy fur trader Philip Pieterse Schuyler (1628-1683) and Margaretha van Slichtenhorst (1628-1711), originally immigrants from Germany.  She was one of ten children born to her parents, including Pieter Schuyler (1657–1724), Arent Schuyler (1662–1730) and Gertruj Schuyler (b. 1654), who was married to Stephanus van Cortlandt (1643–1700).

Career
Alida Schuyler was a major businesswoman particularly during her second marriage: she acted as the business partner and political and economical adviser to him, and together, they divided the responsibility of the business and exerted a considerable economic and political influence in the colony. In 1686, the couple managed to acquire city privileges for Albany. She also participated in a long term lawsuit about the inheritance of her first spouse against his relatives. From 1686, she resided at Livingston Manor. She retired from business for health reasons in 1716.

Alida Schuyler has been taken as an example of an independent American colonial businesswoman. She is also known as the matriarch of several American families.

Personal life
In 1675, she married Nicholas van Rensselaer (1636–1678), the fourth son of Kiliaen van Rensselaer, a Dutch diamond and pearl merchant from Amsterdam who was one of the founders and directors of the Dutch West India Company, who was instrumental in the establishment of New Netherland and in 1630, became the first patroon of Rensselaerswyck.  Her husband, Nicholas, a minister, died shortly after their marriage in 1678.

In 1679, she married her late husband's secretary, Robert Livingston the Elder (1654-1728), the first Lord of Livingston Manor, in 1679. Robert Livingston amassed one of the largest fortunes in 17th-century New York. They had nine children together:

 Rebecca Livingston (1680-1747), who married John Buchanan (1676-1749)
 Margaret Livingston (1681–1758), who married Samuel Vetch (1668–1732), the Royal Governor of Nova Scotia
 Joanna Philipina Livingston (1683–1689), who died young
 Philip Livingston (1686–1749), the second Lord of the Manor who married Catherine Van Brugh
 Robert Livingston (1688–1775), who married Margaret Howarden (1693–1758) and was the owner of the Clermont Estate
 Hubertus "Gilbert" Livingston (b. 1690), who married Cornelia Beekman, granddaughter of Wilhelmus Beekman, Mayor of New York, and niece of Gerardus Beekman
 William Livingston (1692–1692), who died young
 Joanna Livingston (b. 1694)
 Catherine Livingston (1698–1699), who died young

Descendants
She was the grandmother of Philip Livingston and William Livingston.  Her granddaughter, Catherine Livingston, married Abraham De Peyster, who was a loyalist Officer who served with the King's American Regiment and was at Battle of King's Mountain.

Through her son, Gilbert Livingston, she was the grandmother of Margaret Livingston (1738–1818), who married Peter Stuyvesant (1727–1805), a great-grandson of the Peter Stuyvesant who commanded the New Netherland colony on Manhattan island, and Joanna Livingston (1722–1808), who married Pierre Van Cortlandt (1721–1814), the first Lieutenant Governor of the New York.

Many Americans are descended from the Livingston family, including George W. Bush, the entire Fish and Kean families, First Lady Eleanor Roosevelt, First Lady of New York Anna Morton, actors Montgomery Clift and Michael Douglas, actress Jane Wyatt, medical resident Asad Rizvi, poet Robert Lowell, cinematographer Floyd Crosby and his son David Crosby, author Wolcott Gibbs, and almost the entire Astor family.

References

Notes

Sources 

 Kees Kuiken, Schuyler, Alida, in: Digitaal Vrouwenlexicon van Nederland. URL: http://resources.huygens.knaw.nl/vrouwenlexicon/lemmata/data/Schuyler [13/01/2014] 
 
 
 

17th-century American businesspeople
17th-century Dutch businesswomen
17th-century Dutch businesspeople
1656 births
1727 deaths
Colonial American merchants
Alida
People of the Province of New York
People of New Netherland
Alida
Alida
18th-century American businesswomen
18th-century American businesspeople